Tosya, previously called Theodosia (Greek: Θεοδοσία) or Doceia (Greek: Δοκεία) under the Byzantine Empire, is a town in Kastamonu Province in the Black Sea region of Turkey. It is the seat of Tosya District. Its population is 28,963 (2021). It is the home town of the famous Boyner family and the birth place of Markos Vafeiadis (1906–1992), a famous Greek politician.

The North Anatolian Fault is located in this area.  This caused a major earthquake in 1943.

References

External links

 Tosya Municipality 

Populated places in Kastamonu Province
Tosya District
Towns in Turkey